The Atlantic Veterinary College (AVC) is an accredited and globally recognized veterinary school in the Faculty of Veterinary Medicine at University of Prince Edward Island, located in Charlottetown, Prince Edward Island, Canada.

History 
AVC accepted its first class in 1986 at the University of Prince Edward Island. It is the only veterinary school in Atlantic Canada and only one of five in Canada educating Doctor of Veterinary Medicine.

Academics 
The DVM program in AVC is "fully accredited by the Canadian Veterinary Medical Association and the American Veterinary Medical Association, and it is recognized by the Royal College of Veterinary Surgeons in the United Kingdom."

AVC's Doctor of Veterinary Medicine is a four-year professional degree program. Each year AVC accepts 68 students into its DVM program. Forty-one of AVC's annual seats are reserved for residents of Atlantic Canada (New Brunswick has 13 seats, Nova Scotia has 16 seats, Prince Edward Island has 10 seats, and Newfoundland and Labrador has 2 seats). The remaining seats available are for international students.

In addition to a Doctor of Veterinary Medicine (DVM) degree program, AVC offers Master of Science (MSc), Master of Veterinary Science (MVSc) and Doctoral (PhD) programs within the Faculty of Veterinary Medicine.

Some of the academic areas of expertise at the Atlantic Veterinary College include the Center for Veterinary Epidemiological Research, the Center for Aquatic Health Sciences, and the Sir James Dunn Animal Welfare Center.

Deans 
Dr. John VanLeeuwen (DVM, MSc, PhD)
 Interim Dean (2021 - current)
Dr. Gregory P. Keefe (DVM, MSc, MBA)
 Dean (2015 - 2021)
Dr. Daniel Hurnik (DVM, MSc)
 Interim Dean (2014 - 2015)
Dr. Donald L. Reynolds (DVM, PhD, ACVM)
 Dean (2008 - 2014)
Dr. Timothy H. Ogilvie (DVM, MSc, ACVIM)
 Dean (1999 - 2008) 
Interim Dean (1998 - 1999)
Dr. Lawrence E. Heider (DVM ACVPM)
 Dean (1991 - 1998)
Dr. Brian I. Hill (DVM, MS, ACVIM)
 Interim Dean (1990 - 1991)
 Acting Dean (1989 - 1990)
Dr. Reg Thomson (DVM, PhD, MVSc, ACVP)
 Founding Dean (1985 - 1990)

Notable alumni 
 Michelle Oakley, star of Dr. Oakley, Yukon Vet attended AVC.

See also
 University of Prince Edward Island

References

External links
 Atlantic Veterinary College, University of Prince Edward Island

Colleges in Prince Edward Island
University of Prince Edward Island
Veterinary schools in Canada
Educational institutions established in 1986
1986 establishments in Prince Edward Island